The Kingdom of Lithuania was a failed attempt to create an independent constitutional Lithuanian monarchy. It was created towards the end of World War I when Lithuanian-speaking lands were under military occupation by the German Empire. The Council of Lithuania declared Lithuania's independence on February 16, 1918, but the council was unable to form a government, police, or other state institutions due to the continued presence of German troops. The Germans presented various proposals to incorporate Lithuania into the German Empire, particularly Prussia. The Lithuanians resisted this idea and hoped to preserve their independence by creating a separate constitutional monarchy. On 4 June 1918, they voted to offer the Lithuanian throne to the German noble Wilhelm Karl, Duke of Urach. He accepted the offer in July 1918 and took the name Mindaugas II. However, he never visited Lithuania. His election stirred up controversy, divided the council and did not achieve the desired results. As Germany was losing the war and was engulfed in the German Revolution, Lithuania suspended its decision to invite the Duke on 2 November 1918, thereby ending his reign.

Background

After the last Partition of the Polish–Lithuanian Commonwealth in 1795, Lithuania was annexed by the Russian Empire. In 1915, during World War I, Germany occupied western parts of the Russian Empire, including Lithuania. After the Russian Revolution in 1917, Germany conceived the geopolitical strategy of Mitteleuropa, a regional network of puppet states that would serve as a buffer zone. The Germans allowed the organisation of the Vilnius Conference, hoping that it would proclaim that the Lithuanian nation wanted to detach itself from Russia and establish a "closer relationship" with Germany. In September 1917, the Conference elected a twenty-member Council of Lithuania and empowered it to negotiate Lithuanian independence with the Germans. The Germans were preparing for the upcoming negotiations for the Treaty of Brest-Litovsk and sought a declaration from the Lithuanians that they wanted a "firm and permanent alliance" with Germany. Such a declaration was adopted by the Council of Lithuania on December 11, 1917. However, these concessions divided the council and still did not earn recognition from Germany. Therefore, the Council adopted the Act of Independence of Lithuania on February 16, 1918. The Act omitted any mention of alliance with Germany and declared the "termination of all state ties which formerly bound this State to other nations." On March 3, 1918, Germany and Bolshevik Russia signed the Treaty of Brest-Litovsk, which declared that the Baltic nations were in the German interest zone and that Russia renounced any claims to them. On March 23, Germany formally recognized independent Lithuania on the basis of the December 11 declaration. However, the country was still occupied by German troops, the Council still did not have any actual power and it was treated just as an advisory board by the Germans.

Election

Candidates

The crown of Lithuania was initially offered to Wilhelm II, German Emperor and King of Prussia, by the military command of Ober Ost. This would have created a personal union between Lithuania and Prussia. An alternative proposal called for the election of Wilhelm's youngest son, Prince Joachim. Such plans for expansion of already dominant Protestant Prussia were opposed by the Catholic ruling houses, like the Wettins of Saxony and the Wittelsbacher of Bavaria. Saxony promoted Prince Friedrich Christian, second son of King Frederick Augustus III. This proposal was a reminder of historical ties between Saxony and Lithuania: the House of Wettin had produced two rulers for the Polish–Lithuanian Commonwealth between 1697 and 1763. A number of other candidates were also considered. Such plans were viewed by the Lithuanians as a threat to their independence. The threat became more pressing after a meeting of German officials on May 19, where conventions governing the "firm and permanent alliance" were discussed leaving very little autonomy for the Lithuanians.

An idea was advanced to create a constitutional monarchy and invite a candidate who would fight to preserve Lithuanian independence. The Presidium of the Council of Lithuania voted confidentially on June 4, 1918, to establish a hereditary monarchy and to invite Duke Wilhelm of Urach. Duke William was suggested by Matthias Erzberger, who had worked with Lithuanians in Switzerland. His candidacy had been discussed at least since March 1918. Duke William seemed to be a perfect candidate as he was a Catholic, was not in line of succession to the Kingdom of Württemberg due to his grandfather's morganatic marriage, was not closely related to the House of Hohenzollern, and had no ties to Poland. Due to obstacles posed by the German military, the Lithuanian delegation to see Duke William in Freiburg im Breisgau was delayed until July 1. Duke William and his oldest son (as heir apparent) accepted the offer without conditions. On July 11, the Council of Lithuania voted (13 for, 5 against, and 2 abstentions) to officially establish the monarchy. On August 12, the Council sent a formal invitation to Duke William to become King Mindaugas II of Lithuania.

Conditions
Duke William was presented with a twelve-point proposal which resembled medieval pacta conventa. The monarch had the executive power to appoint ministers, sign legislation into law, and initiate legislation in the parliament. The ministers were to be selected from among the Lithuanians and were to ultimately report to the parliament. The King was to abide by the Constitution, protect the independence and territorial integrity of Lithuania, and preserve religious tolerance. Without parliamentary approval, he could not become ruler of another state. The Lithuanian language was to be used as the official state and court language, with a special provision to limit and eventually exclude all foreigners from the royal court. The monarch and his family were obligated to reside in Lithuania, spending no more than 2 months a year abroad. His children were to be educated and raised in Lithuania. In essence, the Lithuanians imposed "elective ethnicity." There were reports that Duke William began learning the Lithuanian language and reading about Lithuanian history and customs, but he never visited Lithuania.

Some authors called these conditions a constitution, but that is not accurate. Lithuanian law scholar Michał Pius Römer has called it an "embryo of a constitution"; these conditions were a very basic and temporary framework that would have developed into a constitution, had not the monarchy been abolished. A project for a full constitution was later found in German archives, but it was never discussed by the Council of Lithuania and remained just a draft.

After the election
The proposal for monarchy was controversial and created a rift between right-wing and left-wing members of the Council of Lithuania. The proposal was most strongly supported by Antanas Smetona, Jurgis Šaulys, and Catholic priests. When the monarchy was approved, four members of the council resigned in protest: Steponas Kairys, Jonas Vileišis, Mykolas Biržiška, Stanisław Narutowicz (Stanislovas Narutavičius). Petras Klimas also voted against, but did not resign. At the same time the Council co-opted six new members: Martynas Yčas, Augustinas Voldemaras, Juozas Purickis, Eliziejus Draugelis, Jurgis Alekna and Stasys Šilingas. The debate over a constitutional monarchy vs. democratic republic was not a new one. Earlier, in December 1917, the council had voted 15-to-5 that a monarchy would suit Lithuania better. The proponents argued that the Lithuanians were not politically mature for a republic and that the Germans would more readily support a monarchy. The opponents maintained that the council had no legal right to determine such fundamental matters as these had been delegated to the future Constituent Assembly of Lithuania by the Vilnius Conference.

The Germans did not approve of the new king. They claimed that their recognition of independent Lithuania was based on the Act of December 11, which provided for an alliance with Germany and therefore Lithuania did not have the right to unilaterally elect a new monarch. They also protested that the Council of Lithuania had changed its name to the State Council of Lithuania just before the approval of Mindaugas II. The Council stopped using its new name in communications with the Germans but stood by its new king. The Lithuanian press was censored and not allowed to publish any news about the new king, while the German press unanimously criticized the decision. When Lietuvos aidas, the newspaper of the council, refused to print an article denouncing the new king, the newspaper was shut down for a month. German–Lithuanian relations remained tense until October 1918. The election also further damaged the reputation of the council, already portrayed as a German puppet, among the Entente powers and the Lithuanian diaspora. Lithuanians in the west thought that Lithuania should place its hopes of independence with the Entente and not Germany. This rift further fractured and weakened the Lithuanian positions.

Republic
As Germany was losing the war, the Lithuanians received more freedom of action. On October 20, 1918, Chancellor of Germany Prince Maximilian of Baden repeated recognition of independent Lithuania, promised to convert the German military administration into a civilian government, and to allow the Lithuanians to take over once they had sufficient capabilities. After receiving this news, the Council of Lithuania convened on October 28 to discuss a provisional constitution and formation of the government. As no projects or drafts had been prepared beforehand, these decisions needed to be made by the council during its session and this process took several days. The changed political situation also dictated the council's need to rescind its decision to elect Mindaugas II. Lithuania, hoping to receive recognition from the Entente, could not have the Entente's enemy as its king. Duke William indicated that he was willing to abandon the throne. Therefore, on November 2, the Council suspended its invitation to Duke William leaving the final decision to the future Constituent Assembly of Lithuania. Later the same day the Council adopted the first provisional constitution, which did not declare either monarchy or republic. The constitution simply organized the government on a provisional basis until the Constituent Assembly made a final decision. Further constitutions did not reconsider a monarchy.

On December 16, 1918, Vincas Mickevičius-Kapsukas became the leader of the puppet state known as Lithuanian Soviet Socialist Republic.

See also
Duchy of Courland and Semigallia (1918)
Kingdom of Finland (1918)
Kingdom of Lithuania
Kingdom of Poland (1917–1918)
Lithuanian Soviet Socialist Republic (1918–19)
United Baltic Duchy

Notes

Citations

Cited sources

 

 

 

 

1918 in Lithuania
Post–Russian Empire states
States and territories established in 1918
States and territories disestablished in 1918
Former unrecognized countries
Former monarchies
Former client states
Former countries